Trains is a monthly magazine about trains and railroads aimed at railroad enthusiasts and railroad industry employees. The magazine primarily covers railroad happenings in the United States and Canada, but has some articles on railroading elsewhere. It is among the 11 magazines published by Kalmbach Media, based in Waukesha, Wisconsin. 

It was founded as Trains in 1940 by publisher Al C. Kalmbach and editorial director Linn Westcott. From October 1951 to March 1954, the magazine was named Trains and Travel.

Jim Wrinn, a former reporter and editor at the Charlotte Observer, served as editor from 2004 until his death in 2022. Carl A. Swanson succeeded him.

Editors
 Al C. Kalmbach, 1940–1948
 Willard V. Anderson, 1948–1953
 David P. Morgan, 1953–1987
 J. David Ingles, 1987–1992
 Kevin P. Keefe, 1992–2000, 2004, 2022 (interim)
 Mark W. Hemphill, 2000–2004
 Jim Wrinn, 2004–2022
 Carl A. Swanson, 2022–present

See also
 Railroad-related periodicals

References

External links 
 

1940 establishments in Wisconsin
Monthly magazines published in the United States
Rail transport magazines published in the United States
Magazines established in 1940
Magazines published in Wisconsin